Legend of the Blues Vol. 1 is an album by American blues pianist Memphis Slim which was released in 1967 on the Jubilee label. The album was reissued on CD in 2008 by Wounded Bird Records.

Reception

In his review for Allmusic, William Ruhlmann says "Memphis Slim shows off his piano abilities on the instrumental 'Broadway Boogie,' but otherwise the ensemble supports him with jazz-blues arrangements for his smooth and authoritative vocals."

Track listing 
All compositions by Peter Chapman
 "Little Lonely Girl" – 2:16    
 "Gone Again" – 4:14    
 "Forty Years Or More" – 4:44    
 "All By Myself" – 2:16     
 "Broadway Boogie" – 3:07     
 "Lend Me Your Love" – 5:00    
 "Ramble This Highway" – 2:57    
 "I Feel Like Ballin' the Jack" – 2:29     
 "Rock Me Woman" – 5:18     
 "This Little Woman" – 3:40

Personnel 
Memphis Slim – vocals, piano
Billy Butler – guitar
Herb Lavelle – drums
Lloyd Trotman – bass
Eddie Chamblee – tenor sax

References 

1967 albums
Memphis Slim albums
Jubilee Records albums